HMCS Queen is a shore based Canadian Forces Naval Reserve unit based at 100 Navy Way in Regina, Saskatchewan. It is one of two in Saskatchewan, the other being HMCS Unicorn in Saskatoon, Saskatchewan. The name is the translation of the Latin word regina.

HMCS Queen was established in 1923. After several locations within the city, HMCS Queen moved into a permanent home in Wascana Park in 1955. Closed in 1964 due to budget cuts, it re-opened in 1975. The battle honours of all HM Ships Queen have been inherited by HMCS Queen.

LCdr Aaron Kaytor assumed command of HMCS Queen in 2022, replacing Cdr Clark Northey.

References

1923 establishments in Saskatchewan
Organizations based in Regina, Saskatchewan
Royal Canadian Naval Reserve
Military units and formations of Canada in World War II